Brouay War Cemetery is a Second World War cemetery of Commonwealth soldiers in France, located between Caen and Bayeux, Normandy. The cemetery contains 377 graves, of which 7 are unidentified. The cemetery is adjacent to the commune's graveyard.

History
During the Allies push out of the Normandy bridgeheads, a key target was the taking of Caen. The majority of those interred in the cemetery were killed in heavy fighting in late June and July 1944 as the Allies encircled Caen (Operation Epsom, Operation Jupiter and Operation Spring).

Location
The cemetery is midway between Bayeux and Caen, in the Calvados department, on the Route d'Audrieu (D.94). It is located 3.25 kilometres southeast of Bayeux. Access is via some steps at the eastern corner of Brouay Church.

Photographs

See also
 American Battle Monuments Commission
 UK National Inventory of War Memorials
 German War Graves Commission
 List of military cemeteries in Normandy

References

Further reading
 Shilleto, Carl, and Tolhurst, Mike (2008). "A Traveler's Guide to D-Day and the Battle of Normandy". Northampton, Mass.: Interlink.

External links
 

World War II memorials in France
World War II cemeteries in France
British military memorials and cemeteries
Commonwealth War Graves Commission cemeteries in France
Canadian military memorials and cemeteries
1944 establishments in France
Cemeteries in Calvados (department)